Dartmouth–Hitchcock Medical Center (DHMC), the flagship campus of the Dartmouth Health system, is the U.S. state of New Hampshire's only academic medical center. DHMC is a 422-inpatient bed hospital and serves as a major tertiary-care referral site for patients throughout northern New England. As an academic medical center, DHMC offers primary, specialty and subspecialty care as well as education and research in partnership with the Geisel School of Medicine at Dartmouth, one of America’s oldest medical schools, as well as the Thayer School of Engineering at Dartmouth and The Dartmouth Institute for Health Policy & Clinical Practice.

It is headquartered in Lebanon, New Hampshire on a  campus in the heart of the Upper Connecticut River Valley and employs more than 8,000 employees. DHMC is New Hampshire's only Level I Trauma Center, one of only three in northern New England, and it includes New Hampshire's only air ambulance service.

DHMC is one of 20 members of the New England Alliance for Health, a regional network of hospitals and other health care organizations in New Hampshire, Vermont and Massachusetts.

Centers and programs

DHMC is home to a number of centers and programs.

The Children's Hospital at Dartmouth Hitchcock Medical Center (CHaD) is the state’s only children’s hospital. Also, the Dartmouth Cancer Center, based at the Norris Cotton Cancer Care Pavilion in Lebanon, is one of only 51 National Cancer Institute-designated comprehensive cancer centers in the nation.

The Dartmouth Hitchcock Advanced Response Team (DHART), which operates out of bases at DHMC and at the Manchester-Boston Regional Airport, provides ground and air medical transportation services to the medical communities of northern New England. In addition, DHART flight crews respond to public safety agency requests for medical evacuation of trauma patients from scenes of injury and will transport to the closest trauma center in the region.
The Center for Surgical Innovation (CSI), a joint endeavor between Dartmouth-Hitchcock, the Geisel School of Medicine at Dartmouth and the Thayer School of Engineering, is a surgical facility that features a controlled surgical environment with integrated multi-modal 3D imaging and prioritization of research activity. The CSI contains two operating rooms and two procedure rooms equipped with advanced technology including CT, MRI, fluoroscopy, robotics and surgical navigation.

The Jack Byrne Center for Palliative & Hospice Care, an inpatient unit of DHMC, offers quality short-term care to seriously ill patients who live in the Upper Valley of New Hampshire and Vermont. The Jack Byrne Center provides personalized care, community programming, clinical research and education opportunities to patients and families.

The Heart & Vascular Center at DHMC provides continuous heart attack care and treats more than 800 patients with heart attacks every year, more than most other academic health centers in New England.

Rankings and recognitions 
In 2022, DHMC was named the #1 hospital in New Hampshire by U.S. News & World Report for the tenth year in a row. It was recognized for high performance in 2 adult specialties, cancer and neurology/neurosurgery, as well as 13 procedures and conditions. Dartmouth Cancer Center was recognized as high performing in colon cancer, lung cancer, ovarian cancer, and uterine cancer surgery, while the Heart & Vascular Center was given high-performance ratings in heart attack, aortic valve surgery, heart bypass surgery, and heart failure. In December 2022, Dartmouth-Hitchcock was rated high performing in maternity care and uncomplicated pregnancy by US News in its new maternity rankings, which includes the 649 best hospitals for maternity in the United States.

DHMC received an “A” Leapfrog Hospital Safety Grade in 2021. This national distinction recognizes achievements in protecting patients from harm and error in the hospital. DHMC was also included in Lown Institute Hospitals Index’s top 10 list of hospitals avoiding overuse, and in the top 3 list of teaching hospitals at avoiding overuse.

Medicare.gov awarded DHMC a 4-star rating on its “Hospital Compare” list, and the Patient Safety Movement Foundation presented DHMC with its 5-Star Hospital award for making commitments to addressing daily patient safety challenges and offering solutions designed to help eliminate preventable patient deaths.

Permanent art collection 
DHMC is home to a varied collection of artwork on display. A collection of Audubon prints donated by Laurance and Mary Rockefeller when the hospital first opened in 1991 is featured throughout the complex. The collection also includes stained glass designed by noted Vermont artist Sabra Field. Additionally, murals painted on-site by artist Sol Levenson can also be found on Level 3 and in the Radiation Oncology Department.

History

1797: Dartmouth Medical School (DMS) was founded by Dr. Nathan Smith. It is the fourth-oldest medical school in the country.

1893: Mary Hitchcock Memorial Hospital (MHMH) was built by Hiram Hitchcock in memory of his wife, Mary Maynard Hitchcock.

1927: Dartmouth-Hitchcock Clinic (DHC) was established by a group of five physicians based on the “Mayo Model” established by the Mayo brothers at their clinic in Minnesota.

1972: Dartmouth’s and Dartmouth-Hitchcock’s Norris Cotton Cancer was opened on the MHMH campus in Hanover.

1988: Dartmouth Hitchcock Medical Center began construction on a new $228 million facility on a 225-acre wooded site in Lebanon, New Hampshire.

1991: On October 5, the new facility opened.

2004: The new Doctors Office Building (now named the Faulkner Building) opened in August, increasing the campus size by 40%, and adding clinical and office space as well as a multi-level parking garage.

2010: The Outpatient Surgery Center opened on June 17, adding 41,000 square feet in eight operating rooms just adjacent to the main complex.

2012: Dartmouth Medical School was renamed The Geisel School of Medicine at Dartmouth in honor of a Audrey and Theodor Geisel, a 1925 graduate of Dartmouth College whose donation to the school through his estate plan made him the most significant philanthropist in the school's history.

2015: Completion of the Williamson Translational Research Building by the Geisel School of Medicine to establish more research and lab space on the main hospital campus.

2020: Ground was broken for a new Patient Pavilion on the DHMC campus on July 22. The Pavilion will be a five-story, 212,000-square-foot structure and will add 112 beds to the institution's patient capacity. Opening is scheduled for early 2023.

2022: Dartmouth-Hitchcock Health rebrands as Dartmouth Health, and also renames the Norris Cotton Cancer Center to the Dartmouth Cancer Center.

Notes 

Hospital buildings completed in 1991
Buildings and structures in Grafton County, New Hampshire
Dartmouth College facilities
Hospitals in New Hampshire
Lebanon, New Hampshire
Teaching hospitals in the United States
1893 establishments in New Hampshire